Behavioral Neuroscience is a bimonthly peer-reviewed scientific journal published by the American Psychological Association. It was established in 1983 and covers research in behavioral neuroscience.

The journal has implemented the Transparency and Openness Promotion (TOP) Guidelines.  The TOP Guidelines provide structure to research planning and reporting and aim to make research more transparent, accessible, and reproducible.

Abstracting and indexing 
The journal is abstracted and indexed by MEDLINE/PubMed and the Social Sciences Citation Index. According to the Journal Citation Reports, the journal has a 2020 impact factor of 1.912.

References

External links 
 

American Psychological Association academic journals
English-language journals
Neuroscience journals
Bimonthly journals
Publications established in 1983